Genypterus is a genus of cusk-eels.

Etymology
Genypterus is derived from the Greek words genyos = face, jaw and pteron = wing, fin.

Species
There are currently five recognized species in this genus:
 Genypterus blacodes (J. R. Forster, 1801) (Pink cusk-eel)
 Genypterus brasiliensis Regan, 1903
 Genypterus capensis (A. Smith, 1847) (Kingklip)
 Genypterus chilensis (Guichenot, 1848) (Red cusk-eel)
 Genypterus maculatus (Tschudi, 1846) (Black cusk-eel)
 Genypterus tigerinus Klunzinger, 1872 (Rock ling)

References

Ophidiidae
Ray-finned fish genera
Taxa named by Rodolfo Amando Philippi